The 2016–17 Investec Women's Hockey Premier Division season  took place between September 2016 and April 2017. Surbiton won the title for the fourth consecutive season. They won both the regular season and the League Finals Weekend.  Reading were relegated to the Conferences.

Regular season

Final table

Results

League Finals Weekend

Semi-finals

Final

Premier Division play-off
The winners of the three regional conferences and the ninth placed team in Premier Division  played a round-robin tournament. The top two placed teams will play in the 2017–18 Premier Division while the bottom two will play in the Conferences. Bowdon Hightown won the group to keep their place in the Premier Division while Buckingham beat Wimbledon and Brooklands Poynton to secure promotion. Buckingham were promoted after a 4–3 win over Wimbledon in a winner-takes-all encounter.

References

2016-17
2016–17 in European field hockey
field hockey
field hockey
2017 in women's field hockey
2016 in women's field hockey